James Nagra Momori was a Ghanaian politician and member of the first parliament of the second republic of Ghana representing Wa East constituency in the Upper Region of Ghana under the membership of the Progess Party (PP).

Early life and education 
James was born in 1919. He attended Tamale Middle Boarding School where he obtained a General Certificate Education G.C.E. (External). He later worked as a farmer before going into Parliament.

Politics 
He began his political career in 1969 when he became the parliamentary candidate to represent his constituency Wa East in the Upper Region of Ghana prior to the commencement of the 1969 Ghanaian parliamentary election.

He was sworn into the First Parliament of the Second Republic of Ghana on 1 October 1969, after being pronounced winner at the 1969 Ghanaian election held on 26 August 1969. His tenure of office ended on 13 January 1972.

Personal life 
He was Muslim (Islam) in faith.

References 

Ghanaian farmers
Ghanaian MPs 1969–1972
Progress Party (Ghana) politicians
Ghanaian Muslims
1919 births
Year of death missing